Parramatta River ferry services connect suburbs along the Parramatta River in Sydney with Circular Quay by commuter ferry. The services are numbered F3 and form part of the Sydney Ferries network.

History
Regular ferry services between Sydney and Parramatta began 2 June 1831, with the first steam ferry named Surprise. Early ferry services between Sydney Cove and Parramatta used paddle steamers.

Due to silting and pollution of the river, Sydney Ferries services on the Parramatta River ceased to serve the wharves west of Meadowbank in 1928. Meanwhile, changes in the design of ferries meant that the deep-hulled vessels were unable to go further upstream than the Meadowbank bridge. However, following dredging work and the introduction of the RiverCat catamarans, the State Transit Authority was able to resume services to Rydalmere and Parramatta in December 1993.

At one time, the New South Wales Government was keen to make extensive use of ferry transport to Sydney Olympic Park for the 2000 Summer Olympics. Although the Sydney Olympic Park ferry wharf was built and opened on 22 September 1997, at the western tip of Homebush Bay, its distance from the Olympic facilities meant that Olympic spectators were largely encouraged to use buses and trains.

Wharves
[
{
  "type": "ExternalData",
  "service": "page",
  "title": "Circular Quay ferry wharf.map"
},
{
  "type": "ExternalData",
  "service": "page",
  "title": "F3 & F4 shared wharves.map"
},
{
  "type": "ExternalData",
  "service": "page",
  "title": "Cockatoo Island ferry wharf.map"
},
{
  "type": "ExternalData",
  "service": "page",
  "title": "Balmain ferry wharf.map"
},
{
  "type": "ExternalData",
  "service": "page",
  "title": "F3 Parramatta River ferry stops.map"
}
]

Circular Quay

Circular Quay is a major Sydney transport hub, with a large ferry, rail and bus interchange. The Cahill Expressway is a prominent feature of the quay, running from the east, over the elevated railway station to join the Sydney Harbour Bridge in the west. Sydney Cove was the site of the initial landing of the First Fleet in Port Jackson. Circular Quay was originally mainly used for shipping and slowly developed into a transport, leisure and recreational centre.

Sydney Ferries services use wharves 2, 3, 4 and 5 at Circular Quay. Each wharf has ticket vending machines and ticket barriers, and is wheelchair-accessible.

Barangaroo
Barangaroo ferry wharf serves Darling Harbour. The wharf is wheelchair-accessible.

Balmain
Balmain ferry wharf serves the suburb of Balmain and is located on Thames Street. Balmain is only served by F3 ferries during peak hours and F8 at all times.

Cockatoo Island
Cockatoo Island ferry wharf serves Cockatoo Island. The wharf is wheelchair-accessible.

Drummoyne
Drummoyne ferry wharf serves the suburb of Drummoyne and is located on Wolseley Street. The wharf is wheelchair-accessible.

Huntleys Point
Huntleys Point ferry wharf serves the suburb of Gladesville and is located on Huntleys Point Road. The wharf is wheelchair-accessible.

Chiswick
Chiswick ferry wharf serves the suburb of Chiswick and is located on Bortfield Drive, Chiswick. The wharf is wheelchair-accessible. The wharf is serviced by bus routes 504 (Chiswick to City Domain via Drummoyne and Rozelle) and 415 (Chiswick to Campsie via Five Dock, Burwood, Strathfield and Belfield).

Abbotsford
Abbotsford ferry wharf serves the suburb of Abbotsford and is located on Great North Road, Abbotsford. The wharf is wheelchair-accessible.
The wharf is served by bus route 438 and L38 (peak) to City Martin Place via Leichhardt. A wharf at the present site was the southern end of Bedlam's Ferry, which existed from at least 1834. It was part of the historic route of the historic (and much longer) Great North Road, which continued on the north bank from Bedlam Point Wharf.

Cabarita
Cabarita ferry wharf serves the suburb of Cabarita and is located on Cabarita Point. As of 2011, it is the busiest and fastest growing wharf on the river. The wharf is wheelchair-accessible.
The wharf is served by bus route 466 to Ashfield railway station via Burwood and Strathfield.

Kissing Point
Kissing Point ferry wharf is located in Kissing Point Park. The wharf is wheelchair-accessible.
The wharf is served by bus route 507 to Macquarie University via Meadowbank and North Ryde, or Circular Quay via Victoria Road.

Meadowbank
Meadowbank ferry wharf was the westernmost point in the Sydney ferry network until 1992. This wharf serves the suburb of Meadowbank and is located on Bowden Street. The wharf is wheelchair-accessible.
The wharf is served by bus route 513 to Carlingford.

Sydney Olympic Park
Sydney Olympic Park ferry wharf serves the Sydney Olympic Park precinct and is located on Bennelong Road. The wharf has a single jetty used for docking of RiverCat ferries. The wharf was built in 1998 for the purpose of serving passengers for the Sydney 2000 Olympics, and served the RiverCat service which brought the Olympic Torch to the Olympic Stadium for the Opening Ceremony. It now serves residents of Wentworth Point. A few services a day terminate at this wharf. The wharf is wheelchair-accessible.
The wharf is served by bus route 526 to Rhodes, or Burwood via Strathfield.

Rydalmere
Rydalmere ferry wharf opened in 1992, this wharf serves the suburb of Rydalmere and is located on John Street. The wharf is wheelchair-accessible.

Parramatta
Parramatta ferry wharf opened in 1992, this wharf serves the city of Parramatta and is located on Charles Street. The wharf is wheelchair-accessible. Services between Rydalmere and Parramatta are replaced by buses during extreme low tides.

Patronage
The following table shows the patronage of Sydney Ferries network for the year ending 30 June 2022.

References

External links
F3 Parramatta River at Transport for New South Wales
F8 Cockatoo Island at Transport for New South Wales

Ferry transport in Sydney
Parramatta River